Salman the Persian is a currently filming (since 18 December 2019) Iranian history television series directed by Davood Mirbagheri, based on the life of Salman the Persian, an Iranian companion of the Prophet of Islam. It was originally shot in the Persian language. The story of this series is narrated from the birth of Roozbeh (Salman) until his death.

Cast 
Alireza Shoja Nouri is going to play the middle-aged role of Salman the Persian in the series. According to media reports, the producer of the series told the media about the actors that 20,000 actors from all over the country have been identified and 1,500 characters are present in the series. Director of Salman the Persian, Davood Mirbagheri also uses foreign actors. In this series, a large number of young theater actors from all over the country have been used to play roles.

See also 

 List of Islamic films

References

External links 
 

Television series about Islam
Iranian television series
2020s Iranian television series
2020 Iranian television series debuts
Islamic Republic of Iran Broadcasting original programming